The New Zealand Superstock Teams Championship is a 2-day event held annually at Central Energy Trust Arena in Palmerston North, New Zealand. The event attracts crowds of 14,000 people on each day of the event, as they are entertained by up to 14 teams, all fighting with full-contact allowed for the ultimate New Zealand speedway crown. In 2018, the event gave the region a $5.2M economic boost, an estimated $1.5M up from 2017.

Racing

Superstocks racing allows for full contact, hardcore racing around oval dirt tracks with concrete walls in close proximity to the outside of the track. Drivers are entitled to push one another into the infield, up the wall or into one another in the fight for victory. With no blue flags backmarker cars may wait for the lead pack and if drivers wish, may take out lead cars to best suit their team. Superstocks teams racing consists of 2 teams facing off in each race progressing through qualifying night for a chance to be in the grand final. Teams of 5 cars take part with 1 car from either team sitting out each race as a reserve car. With a total of 4 cars in the race for each team most teams use a 2:2 tactic with 2 cars attacking and going to the victory while 2 cars block the other team from taking out their attackers. Because of the all-out nature of the sport there are often many rollovers and cars up into the catch fencing, leading to red flags where cars must stop in as little distance as possible, hold position and wait until the accident is cleared and the green flag is shown once again.

Deaths

There have been two deaths at the Superstock Teams Racing championship.

On 9 February 2009, Peter Barry, aged 44, was flown to Wellington Hospital in a critical condition with severe head injury.  He succumbed to the injuries six days later at 6pm, February 12. Barry was driving a block car for the Kihikihi Kings versus the Hawkes Bay Hawkeyes when he lost consciousness from multiple hits between cars and the concrete wall. Barry's car continued to move slowly along the track for three quarters of a lap before a flag marshall stopped it. The coroner accepted fatalities were relatively rare in superstock racing, although the likelihood of injury was not. It was inherently high risk and violent, especially in teams' racing, where drivers crashed into each other on purpose. The coroner raised concerns about the HANS (head and neck restraint system) device, a safety item compulsory in many motorsports. The HANS device is now a primary piece of safety equipment used by every driver when racing.

In 2022 the Championships were not completed after Stephen Penn who was driving for the Manawatu Mustangs crashed and sustained injuries leading to his death on the track.

Past Champions

References 

National championships in New Zealand